Metal is a low-level, low-overhead hardware-accelerated 3D graphic and compute shader API created by Apple. It debuted in iOS 8. Metal combines functions similar to OpenGL and OpenCL in one API. It is intended to improve performance by offering low-level access to the GPU hardware for apps on iOS, iPadOS, macOS, and tvOS. It can be compared to low-level APIs on other platforms such as Vulkan and DirectX 12.

Metal is an object-oriented API that can be invoked using the Swift, Objective-C or C++17 programming languages.  Full-blown GPU execution is controlled via the Metal Shading Language. According to Apple promotional materials: "MSL [Metal Shading Language] is a single, unified language that allows tighter integration between the graphics and compute programs. Since MSL is C++-based, you will find it familiar and easy to use."

Features
Metal aims to provide low-overhead access to the GPU. Commands are encoded beforehand and then submitted to the GPU for asynchronous execution. The application controls when to wait for the execution to complete thus allowing application developers to increase throughput by encoding other commands while commands are executed on the GPU or save power by explicitly waiting for GPU execution to complete. Additionally, command encoding is CPU independent thus applications can encode commands to each CPU thread independently. Lastly, render states are pre-computed beforehand, allowing the GPU driver to know in advance how to configure and optimize the render pipeline before command execution. 

Metal improves the capabilities of GPGPU programming by using compute shaders. Metal uses a specific shading language based on C++14, implemented using Clang and LLVM.

Metal offers application developers the flexibility where to create Metal resources (buffers, textures). Resources can be allocated on the CPU, GPU, or both and provides facilities to update and synchronize allocated resources. Metal can also enforce a resource's state during a command encoder's lifetime.  

On macOS, Metal can provide application developers the discretion to specify which GPU to execute. Application developers can choose between the low-power integrated GPU of the CPU, the discrete GPU (on certain MacBooks and Macs) or an external GPU connected through Thunderbolt. Application developers also have the preference on how GPU commands are executed on which GPUs and provides suggestion on which GPU a certain command is most efficient to execute (commands to render a scene can be executed by the discrete GPU while post-processing and display can be handled by the integrated GPU).

Metal Performance Shaders
Metal Performance Shaders is a highly optimized library of graphics functions that can help application developers achieve great performance at the same time decrease work on maintaining GPU family specific functions.  It provides functions including:

 Image filtering algorithms
 Neural network processing
 Advanced math operations
 Ray tracing

History
Metal has been available since June 2, 2014 on iOS devices powered by Apple A7 or later, and since June 8, 2015 on Macs (2012 models or later) running OS X El Capitan.

On June 5, 2017, at WWDC, Apple announced the second version of Metal, to be supported by macOS High Sierra, iOS 11 and tvOS 11. Metal 2 is not a separate API from Metal and is supported by the same hardware. Metal 2 enables more efficient profiling and debugging in Xcode, accelerated machine learning, lower CPU workload, support for virtual reality on macOS, and specificities of the Apple A11 GPU, in particular.

At the 2020 WWDC, Apple announced the migration of the Mac to Apple silicon. Macs using Apple silicon will feature Apple GPUs with a feature set combining what was previously available on macOS and iOS, and will be able to take advantage of features tailored to the tile based deferred rendering (TBDR) architecture of Apple GPUs.

At the 2022 WWDC, Apple announced the third version of Metal (Metal 3), which would debut with the release of macOS Ventura, iOS 16 and iPadOS 16. Metal 3 introduces the MetalFX upscaling framework, which renders complex scenes in less time per frame with high-performance upscaling and anti-aliasing. Also announced possibility to use C/C++ for Metal API.

Supported GPUs
The first version and the second version of Metal API supports the following hardware and software stated as below:
 Apple A7 SoC or later Apple silicon with iOS 8 or later iOS operating system
 Apple M1 SoC or later Apple silicon with macOS 11 or later macOS operating system
 Intel Processor with Intel HD and Iris Graphics 4000 series or later with OS X 10.11 or later macOS operating system
 AMD Graphics with GCN or RDNA architecture with OS X 10.11 or later macOS operating system
 NVIDIA Graphics with Kepler architecture with OS X 10.11 to macOS 11 operating system
 NVIDIA Graphics with Maxwell architecture or Pascal architecture with OS X 10.11 to macOS 10.13 operating system

The third version of Metal API supports the following hardware and software stated as below:
 Apple A13 or later Apple silicon with iOS 16, iPadOS 16 or later iOS or iPadOS operating system
 Apple M1 SoC or later Apple silicon with macOS 13 or later macOS operating system
 Intel Processor with Intel UHD 630 or Iris Plus (Kaby Lake or later) with macOS 13 or later macOS operating system
 AMD Graphics with RDNA architecture (5000 and 6000 series) and Pro Vega (5th generation GCN architecture)

Adoption

According to Apple, more than 148,000 applications use Metal directly, and 1.7 million use it through high-level frameworks, as of June 2017. macOS games using Metal for rendering are listed below.

See also
 Direct3D – DirectX 12 introduces low-level APIs
 Mantle – low-level API by AMD
 Vulkan – low-overhead successor to OpenGL
 MoltenVK - software compatibility library to run Vulkan software on top of the Metal API
 WebGPU

References

External links
 Metal for Developers
 Metal Programming Guide (preliminary)
 WWDC14 demo; extended version
 Install macOS 10.14 Mojave on Mac Pro (Mid 2010) and Mac Pro (Mid 2012) - Apple article explaining what GPUs are compatible with Apple's Metal APIs on Mac OS 10.14 (Mojave) operating system

Computer-related introductions in 2014
3D graphics APIs
Graphics libraries
IOS